Paul Durousseau (born August 11, 1970) is an American serial killer who murdered seven young women (including two who were pregnant) in the southeastern United States between 1997 and 2003. German authorities suspect he may have killed several local women when he was stationed there with the U.S. Army during the early 1990s. Typically, Durousseau would gain the victim's trust, enter the victim's home, tie their hands, rape, then strangle them to death. All of his known victims were young, single African-American women.

Personal life 
Paul Durousseau was born in Beaumont, Texas. In 1970, he moved in with his mother's family in Los Angeles after his father, unwed to his mother, deserted them. Little else is known publicly about Durousseau's childhood. After graduating high school, 19-year-old Durousseau found himself working as a security guard. His first offenses as an adult took place on December 18, 1991, and January 21, 1992, for carrying a concealed firearm in California.

In November 1992, Durousseau enlisted in the U.S. Army and was stationed in Germany, where he met Natoca, who would later become his wife. The two married in 1995 in Las Vegas. In 1996, they were transferred to Fort Benning, Georgia. On March 13, 1997, Durousseau was arrested for kidnapping and raping a young woman. However, in August of that year he was cleared of those charges. Soon after, he was found in possession of stolen goods. He was court-martialed in January 1999, found guilty and dishonorably discharged from the Army.

Durousseau and his wife moved to Jacksonville, Florida, where they had two daughters. It was during that period that he committed most of the murders. He struggled to keep jobs to make ends meet, and the couple would often have fights over the issue of finances. In 1999, the police advised Durousseau's wife on how to file for a restraining order after he allegedly slapped her in the face and grabbed her by the neck. Later, she testified he got violently angry when she talked about getting a divorce. In September and October 2001, Durousseau spent 48 days in jail for domestic battery.

Durousseau still managed to hold various legitimate jobs. In 2001, he was hired as a school bus driver and an animal control worker despite being a convicted felon. In 2003, he worked as a taxi driver and it is now accepted that this is how he first came into contact with some of his victims. It was erroneously reported that Gator City Taxi Company failed to run a background check on Durousseau; the City of Jacksonville was responsible for the background check, and issued Durousseau's taxi driver permit.

Neighbors and friends described Durousseau as a "lewd womanizer". He often asked young women when they planned to "make flicks" with him. A witness recalled Durousseau hitting on a girl that appeared to be around 13 or 14 years old.

Chronology of the murders 
Less than one month after the acquittal over the rape charges, the nude body of 26-year-old Tracy Habersham was found on September 7, 1997, in Fort Benning. She had been missing for 48 hours and was last seen leaving a party. She had been raped and strangled to death with a cord. Durousseau was not a suspect in the murder, but DNA would later tie him to the crime. He later confessed to Habersham's killing after his arrest.

In 1999, Durousseau raped and killed 24-year-old Tyresa Mack in her apartment. Witnesses saw him leave her place carrying a television. In 2001, he was arrested for raping a young woman in Jacksonville. He spent 30 days in jail and received two years' probation. On December 19, 2002, 18-year-old Nicole L. Williams' body was found wrapped in a blue blanket at the bottom of a ditch in Jacksonville. She had been reported missing two days earlier.

On January 1, 2003, family members of 19-year-old Nikia Kilpatrick went to check on her. They had not had any news from her for several days. They found her body in the bedroom of her apartment. She had been raped then killed by strangulation with a cord two days before. Her two sons, an eleven-month-old and a two-year-old, were alive but malnourished. Kilpatrick was approximately six months pregnant at the time of her death. Eight days later, 20-year-old nurse assistant Shawanda Denise McCalister, who was also pregnant at the time of her death, was raped and strangled in her Jacksonville apartment. The murder scene was almost identical to that of Kilpatrick. She was killed on Durousseau's first day of driving a cab for Gator City Taxi. Her body was found the following day.

The next two victims were 17-year-old Jovanna Jefferson, and 19-year-old Surita Cohen. Their bodies were found close to each other in a ditch next to a construction site on New Kings Road in Jacksonville on February 5. Police estimated that Jefferson was murdered around January 20 and Cohen was killed 10 days later. Witnesses recount having seen the two last victims with a taxi driver fitting Paul Durousseau's description on the night they disappeared.

Durousseau was arrested and charged with five counts of murder on June 17, 2003. On December 13, 2007, he was sentenced to death by lethal injection for the murder of Tyresa Mack. As of August 18, 2013, he was still a resident on Florida's death row at Union Correctional Institution. In January 2017, Durousseau's death sentence was overturned by the Florida Supreme Court. The jury that sentenced Durousseau was split 10-2 and the high court declared a split decision unconstitutional in capital sentencing. He was resentenced to life in prison without parole on December 10, 2021, after a jury split 10–2 in favor of another death sentence.

See also
 List of death row inmates in the United States
 List of serial killers in the United States

References

1970 births
1991 crimes in the United States
1997 murders in the United States
20th-century African-American people
20th-century American criminals
21st-century African-American people
21st-century American criminals
African-American people
American murderers of children
American people convicted of murder
American people convicted of rape
American prisoners sentenced to death
American rapists
American serial killers
American taxi drivers
Bus drivers
Criminals from Texas
Living people
Male serial killers
Military personnel from Texas
People acquitted of kidnapping
People acquitted of rape
People convicted of domestic violence
People convicted of murder by Florida
People from Beaumont, Texas
People from Jacksonville, Florida
Prisoners sentenced to death by Florida
United States Army soldiers